Jesús Rivas (born 1 September 1923) was a Venezuelan equestrian. He competed in two events at the 1956 Summer Olympics.

References

External links
 

1923 births
Possibly living people
Venezuelan male equestrians
Olympic equestrians of Venezuela
Equestrians at the 1956 Summer Olympics
Place of birth missing (living people)
20th-century Venezuelan people
21st-century Venezuelan people